Lance Woolridge (born 30 July 1991) is a rally driver from South Africa.

A two-time Class T champion in the South African Cross Country Series, he was signed by Veloce Racing as reserve driver for the inaugural season of the new electric off-road racing series Extreme E in 2021. He made his series debut at the season-ending Jurassic X-Prix in Dorset, replacing Stéphane Sarrazin, and was subsequently promoted to full-time driver for 2022 alongside Christine GZ.

Racing record

Complete Extreme E results
(key)

* Season still in progress.

References

Living people
1991 births
Sportspeople from Pietermaritzburg
South African rally drivers
Extreme E drivers

World Rallycross Championship drivers